Andrew or Andy King may refer to:

Andrew King (astrophysicist) (born 1947), British astrophysicist
Andrew King (architect), Canadian architect and cross-disciplinary artist
Andrew King (mayor) (born 1960 or 1961), former mayor of Hamilton, New Zealand
Andrew King (music manager) (born 1942), formerly of Blackhill Enterprises
Andrew King (neurophysiologist) (born 1959), British neurophysiologist
Andrew King (professor) (born 1957), British professor of English literature
Andrew King (representative) (1812–1895), member of the U.S. House of Representatives from Missouri
Andrew King (rugby league) (born 1975), Australian rugby league footballer
Andrew Jackson King (1833–1923), American lawyer, judge, and legislator
Andy King (American football) (born 1978), American football player
Andy King (American politician) (born 1962), member of the New York City Council
Andy King (British politician) (born 1948), British Labour politician
Andy King (footballer, born 1942) (1942–2015), Scottish footballer
Andy King (footballer, born 1956) (1956–2015), English footballer and manager
Andy King (footballer, born 1970), English footballer
Andy King (footballer, born 1988), Wales international footballer

See also
Andrew Lawrence-King (born 1959), British harpist and early music specialist